Male Pece (in older sources also Male Peče) is a small village in the Municipality of Ivančna Gorica in central Slovenia. The area is part of the historical region of Lower Carniola. The municipality is now included in the Central Slovenia Statistical Region.

Church

The local church in the settlement is dedicated to Saint Lambert and belongs to the Parish of Šentvid pri Stični. It dates to the second quarter of the 17th century.

References

External links

Male Pece on Geopedia

Populated places in the Municipality of Ivančna Gorica